Shishak, Shishaq, or Susac (Tiberian:) was, according to the Hebrew Bible, an Egyptian pharaoh who sacked Jerusalem in the 10th century BCE. He is usually identified with the pharaoh Shoshenq I.

Biblical narrative

Shishak's campaign against the Kingdom of Judah and his sack of Jerusalem are recounted in the Hebrew Bible, in 1 Kings 14:25 and 2 Chronicles 12:1-12. According to these accounts, Shishak had provided refuge to Jeroboam during the later years of Solomon's reign, and upon Solomon's death, Jeroboam became king of the tribes in the north, which separated from Judah to become the Kingdom of Israel. In the fifth year of Rehoboam's reign, commonly dated ca. 926 BCE, Shishak swept through Judah with a powerful army of 60,000 horsemen and 1,200 chariots, in support of Jeroboam.

Shishak took away treasures of the Temple of Yahweh and the king's house, as well as shields of gold which Solomon had made; Rehoboam replaced them with brass ones.

According to Second Chronicles,

Flavius Josephus in Antiquities of the Jews adds to this a contingent of 400,000 infantrymen. According to Josephus, his army met with no resistance throughout the campaign, taking Rehoboam's most fortified cities "without fighting". Finally, he conquered Jerusalem without resistance, because "Rehoboam was afraid." Shishak did not destroy Jerusalem, but forced King Rehoboam of Judah to strip the Temple and his treasury of their gold and movable treasures.

Shishak was also related by marriage to Jeroboam. The wife of Jeroboam is unnamed in the Masoretic Text, but according to the Septuagint, she was an Egyptian princess called Ano:
And Sousakim gave to Jeroboam Ano the eldest sister of Thekemina his wife, to him as wife; she was great among the king's daughters...

Shishak's name
The spelling and pronunciation of Shishak's name is not consistent throughout the Hebrew Bible. It occurs three times as Šīšaq (שִׁישַׁק), three times as Šīšāq (שִׁישָׁק), and once as Šūšaq (שׁוּשַׁק).

Shishak identified as Pharaoh Shoshenq I
In the very early years after the decipherment of Egyptian hieroglyphs, on chronological, historical, and linguistic grounds, nearly all Egyptologists identified Shishak with Shoshenq I of the 22nd dynasty, who invaded Canaan following the Battle of Bitter Lakes. This position has been maintained by most scholars ever since, and remains the majority position today. The fact that Shoshenq I left behind "explicit records of a campaign into Canaan (scenes; a long list of Canaanite place-names from the Negev to Galilee; stelae), including a stela [found] at Megiddo" supports the traditional interpretation. There are however some notable exceptions, such as Jerusalem itself which is not mentioned in any of his campaign records. This would seem contradictory to the biblical account which explicitly mentions Jerusalem. Nevertheless, a common variant of Shoshenq's name omits its 'n' glyphs, resulting in a pronunciation like, "Shoshek".

The Bubastite Portal

The Bubastite Portal, a relief discovered at Karnak, in Upper Egypt, and similar reliefs on the walls of a small temple of Amun at el-Hibeh, shows Pharaoh Shoshenq I holding in his hand a bound group of prisoners. The names of captured towns are located primarily in the territory of the kingdom of Israel (including Megiddo), with a few listed in the Negeb, and perhaps Philistia. Some of these include a few of the towns that Rehoboam had fortified according to Chronicles.

The portal is generally considered to record a historical campaign of Sheshonq I in Judah, but it makes no mention of Jerusalem being sacked, nor of Rehoboam or Jeroboam. Various explanations of this omission of Jerusalem have been proposed: its name may have been erased, the list may have been copied from an older pharaoh's list of conquests, or Rehoboam's ransoming the city (as described in the Second Book of Chronicles) would have saved it from being listed.

Critical questions
It has been claimed that the numbers of Egyptian soldiers given in Chronicles can be "safely ignored as impossible" on Egyptological grounds; similarly, the numbers of chariots reported in 2 Chronicles is likely exaggerated by a factor of ten—leading 60,000 horses through the Sinai and Negev would have been logistically impossible, and no evidence of Egyptian cavalry exists from before the 27th Dynasty.  The treasures taken by Shishak are also highly unlikely. Firstly, no United Monarchy of Israel and Judah occurs in Shoshenq's list of conquered enemies; second, the material culture of 10th century Jerusalem and surroundings is alleged by some scholars such as Israel Finkelstein to have been too primitive to allow for any treasure that an Egyptian pharaoh would have been interested in. Finkelstein concludes that the looting narrative "should probably be seen as a theological construct rather than as historical references". By contrast, Krystal V. L. Pierce has pointed that a relief from Karnak records Sheshonq I presenting the tribute from his Levantine campaign to Amun-Re, and that the Pharaoh used the tribute to finance the construction of several monumental structures across Egypt.

Fringe theories
Other identifications of Shishak have been put forward by chronological revisionists, arguing that Shoshenq's account does not match the Biblical account very closely, but these are considered fringe theories. In his book Ages in Chaos, Immanuel Velikovsky identified him with Thutmose III of the 18th dynasty. More recently, David Rohl's New Chronology identified him with Ramesses II of the 19th dynasty, and Peter James has identified him with Ramesses III of the 20th dynasty.

In popular culture
Shishak is mentioned in Steven Spielberg's action-adventure film Raiders of the Lost Ark as the pharaoh who seized the Ark of the Covenant from the Temple of Solomon during his raids on Jerusalem and hid it in the Well of Souls in Tanis.

References

Further reading
 
 Ad Thijs,'From the Lunar Eclipse of Takeloth II back to Shoshenq I and Shishak' In: P. James and P. van der Veen (eds.), Solomon and Shishak, BAR International Series 2732, Archaeopress, Oxford, 2015: pp. 42–60
 Peter van der Veen, The name Shishak, an update, JACF 10(2005), pp. 8, 42
 Peter van der Veen, 'The Name Shishaq: Shoshenq or Shyshu/q? Responding to the Critics and Assessing the Evidence ' In: P. James and P. van der Veen (eds.), Solomon and Shishak, BAR International Series 2732, Archaeopress, Oxford, 2015
 Troy Leiland Sagrillo. 2015. "Shoshenq I and biblical Šîšaq: A philological defense of their traditional equation." In Solomon and Shishak: Current perspectives from archaeology, epigraphy, history and chronology; proceedings of the third BICANE colloquium held at Sidney Sussex College, Cambridge 26–27 March 2011, edited by Peter J. James, Peter G. van der Veen, and Robert M. Porter. British Archaeological Reports (International Series) 2732. Oxford: Archaeopress. 61–81.

External links
The Campaign of Pharaoh Shoshenq I in Palestine, by Kevin A. Wilson
The Palestine Campaign of Sheshonq I
The Sack of Jerusalem on Templemount.org

10th-century BC biblical rulers
Pharaohs in the Bible